The 2005 GP Miguel Induráin was the 52nd edition of the GP Miguel Induráin cycle race and was held on 2 April 2005. The race was won by Javier Pascual Rodríguez.

General classification

References

2005
2005 in Spanish road cycling